is the second album by Japanese boy band Kis-My-Ft2. It was released on March 27, 2013, in Japan under the record label Avex Trax.

Overview 
Approximately one year after their first album Kis-My-1st, Good Ikuze! was released with 2 limited editions: with the DVD  as well as with the special CD Kis-My-Zero 3.

On the weekly Oricon charts published April 8, 2013, the simultaneous release of their single キ・ス・ウ・マ・イ 〜KISS YOUR MIND〜／S.O.S (Smile On Smile), their DVD YOSHIO -NEW MEMBER-, and their album Good Ikuze! granted them all the number one spot in their respective categories, with sales totalling over 2,140,000. The feat of taking top spots in DVD, single, and album sales at the same time had previously only been accomplished by Ayumi Hamasaki and KAT-TUN.

Track listing

References

External links 
 DISCOGRAPHY：Kis-My-Ft2 Official Website

2013 albums
Avex Group albums